The Victoria Cross is a military decoration awarded for valour of the British and Commonwealth forces. The highest and most prestigious award for gallantry in the face of the enemy, it was first instituted by Queen Victoria in 1856 after the Crimean War.  Officially there have been 22 Imperial Victoria Crosses awarded to New Zealand military personnel. These awards were bestowed upon 21 individuals, with Charles Upham receiving the award on two occasions.

Background
Established in 1856, the Victoria Cross has been awarded to service personnel for extraordinary valour and devotion to duty while facing a hostile force. Between 1858 and 1881 the Victoria Cross could also be awarded for actions taken "under circumstances of extreme danger" not in the face of the enemy. Six people (four Irish, one English and one Canadian) were awarded Victoria Crosses under this clause (one in 1866 during the Fenian raids, five for a single incident in 1867 during the Andaman Islands Expedition), until it was amended in 1881 to only allow acts "in the presence of the enemy".

In 1999 the Victoria Cross for New Zealand was created as a separate version of the award solely for New Zealand personnel. To date, there has been one recipient of that award – Willie Apiata for actions in Afghanistan in 2004 – although recipients of the Victoria Cross for New Zealand are not included on this list.

Summary
The first award to a New Zealander came in 1864 when Charles Heaphy received a Victoria Cross for his actions during the Invasion of Waikato during the New Zealand Wars. Since then there has been one award to a New Zealander serving during the Second Boer War, 11 during World War I, and nine in World War II. There were no awards to New Zealanders for service during the Korean War or the Vietnam War.

In addition to the 22 awards to New Zealand military personnel, there have been seven other awards to New Zealanders serving in overseas forces, which are not included in the official count. Of these, the majority served with the Australian forces during the First World War, including: Alfred Shout, Percy Storkey, Lawrence Weathers, and Thomas Cooke, all of whom are listed as Australian recipients.  New Zealand's most famous soldier, Bernard Freyberg is sometimes listed as a New Zealand recipient, although he was serving in the British Army when he performed the deeds that led to his award in 1916, and is not included in the official count. William Barnard Rhodes-Moorhouse received the award posthumously for service with the Royal Flying Corps in 1915, while William Edward Sanders, commanding HMS Prize, received the award for actions at sea in 1917 while serving in the Royal Navy Reserve. An eighth, Cecil D'Arcy (born in Wanganui), who served during the Anglo-Zulu War in 1879, is variously listed as a New Zealand or South African recipient, but is not officially included on the list of New Zealanders who received the award in overseas forces.

Recipients

Notes

References

Further reading

Lists of recipients of the Victoria Cross by nationality